Pixie is a feminine given name of English origin. Notable people with the name include:

 Pixie Davies (born 2006), English actress
 Pixie Fletcher (1930/1931–1961), New Zealand hurdler
 Pixie Geldof (born 1990), English model and singer
 Pixie Jenkins (born 1957), Australian musician
 Pixie Lott (born 1991), English singer-songwriter
 Pixie McKenna (born 1971), Irish physician and TV presenter
 Pixie O'Harris (1903–1991), Australian artist
 Pixie Smith or Pamela Colman Smith (1878–1951), English artist and illustrator
 Pixie Williams (1928–2013), New Zealand singer

English feminine given names